Representative Tsongas may refer to:

 Niki Tsongas, former U.S. Representative from MA-05, then MA-03
 Paul Tsongas, former U.S. Representative from MA-05